The women's tournament of the 2010 European Curling Championships took place from December 4 – 11, 2010. Winners of the Group C tournament in Howwood, Scotland will move on to the Group B tournament in Monthey. The top 6 women's teams at the 2010 ECC (aside from defending world champion Germany and host country Denmark), will represent their respective nations at the 2011 Capital One World Women's Curling Championship in Esbjerg, Denmark.

Group A

Teams

Standings

Results

Draw 1
Saturday, December 4, 8:00

Draw 2
Saturday, December 4, 16:00

Draw 3
Sunday, December 5, 11:00

Draw 4
Sunday, December 5, 20:00

Draw 5
Monday, December 6, 12:00

Draw 6
Monday, December 6, 20:00

Draw 7
Tuesday, December 7, 15:00

Draw 8
Wednesday, December 8, 10:00

Draw 9
Wednesday, December 8, 20:00

World Challenge

Challenge 1
Friday, December 10, 20:00

Challenge 2
Saturday, December 11, 09:30

Challenge 3
Saturday, December 11, 13:00

Playoffs

1 vs. 2
Thursday, December 9, 20:00

3 vs. 4
Thursday, December 9, 20:00

Semifinal
Friday, December 10, 20:00

Bronze-medal game
Saturday, December 11, 8:00

Gold-medal game
Saturday, December 11, 12:00

Group B

Teams

Standings

Results

Draw 1
Saturday, December 4, 12:00

Draw 2
Saturday, December 4, 20:00

Draw 3
Sunday, December 5, 12:00

Draw 4
Sunday, December 5, 20:00

Draw 5
Monday, December 6, 12:00

Draw 6
Monday, December 6, 20:00

Draw 7
Tuesday, December 7, 12:00

Draw 8
Tuesday, December 7, 20:00

Draw 9
Wednesday, December 8, 12:00

Tiebreaker
Thursday, December 9, 9:00 
placement tiebreaker, decides relegated team

Playoffs

1 vs. 2Thursday, December 9, 18:003 vs. 4Thursday, December 9, 18:00SemifinalFriday, December 10, 18:00Bronze-medal gameSaturday, December 11, 9:30Gold-medal gameFriday, December 10, 13:00Group C

Teams

Standings

Results

Draw 1Friday, 24 September, 21:00 receives bye this round.Draw 2Saturday, 25 September, 12:00 receives bye this round.Draw 3Saturday, 25 September, 19:00 receives bye this round.Draw 4Sunday, 26 September, 10:00 receives bye this round.Draw 5Sunday, 26 September, 15:00 receives bye this round.FinalMonday, 27 September, 18:00''

 and  advance to the Group B competition in Monthey.

External links
European Curling Championships 2010 - Women's Results Page
2010 ECC Group C
Greenacres CC Results page

European Curling Championships
European Curling Championships - Women's Tournament, 2010
European Curling Championships
Women's curling competitions in Switzerland